Thomas Carson Filer (born December 1, 1956) is an American former professional baseball player and coach.

Career
He was signed by the New York Yankees as an amateur free agent in 1978. Filer played his first professional season with their Class-A (Short Season) Oneonta Yankees in 1979, and his last with the Mets' Triple-A Norfolk Tides in 1993. He graduated from La Salle University with a B.S. in Marketing. He is currently the Assistant Pitching Coordinator for the Pittsburgh Pirates.

References

External links

1956 births
Living people
American expatriate baseball players in Canada
Baseball players from Pennsylvania
Chicago Cubs players
Columbus Clippers players
Denver Zephyrs players
Dunedin Blue Jays players
Iowa Cubs players
Iowa Oaks players
Knoxville Blue Jays players
La Salle Explorers baseball players
La Salle University alumni
Major League Baseball pitchers
Milwaukee Brewers players
Minor league baseball coaches
Nashville Sounds players
New York Mets players
Norfolk Tides players
Oneonta Yankees players
Syracuse Chiefs players
Tidewater Tides players
Toronto Blue Jays players
West Haven Yankees players